Paris Intarakomalyasut (also known as Ice; born 22 October 1998) is a Thai actor and singer.  He is known for his main roles as Chi in In Family We Trust (2018) and as Pat in Bad Genius: The Series (2020).

Early life and education
Paris was born to Maris, who died a few years ago, and Pippa Intarakomalyasut and is their youngest child. He is currently taking up a bachelor's degree from the Faculty of Communication Arts at Chulalongkorn University. He is currently living with his mother and older sisters.

Career
He started his acting career as a guest in Project S The Series: Skate Our Souls which aired on GMM 25. He then made his acting debut in 2018, as part of 4Nologue's boy group project Nine by Nine, by playing the role of Chi for In Family We Trust where he acknowledged the similarities of his character in the series and his real life experience, as someone who has lost a father, which made him more passionate about portraying the role. This later earned him GQ Thailand New Face of the Year award for 2018. He went on to land in another main role for Great Men Academy together with six other members of Nine by Nine.

He also ventured into singing as part of Nine by Nine, which debuted in November 2018, with the release of their first single "Night Light" from the group's mini album entitled "En Route". In 2019, he teamed up with Nichaphat Chatchaipholrat (Pearwah) for "รักติดไซเรน" (Rak Tid Siren), the OST for My Ambulance. The song is considered as one of the two biggest Thai songs for 2019 alongside "ธารารัตน์" (Thararat) by Youngohm according to Google and has already reached over 246 million views on YouTube. He was also tapped for "Human Error", a project by GMM Grammy in collaboration with LINE TV and Nadao Music, where he got to work with his co-members in Nine by Nine namely Krissanapoom Pibulsonggram (JJ) and Chonlathorn Kongyingyong (Captain).

In 2021, Paris starred for the first time as a lead role in the Netflix original film, Ghost Lab.

In November 2021, Paris released his latest single entitled "Smile In The Sky" where he co-directed its accompanying music video.

Filmography

Films

Television series

Discography

Awards and nominations

References

External links
 
 
 

1998 births
Living people
Paris Intarakomalyasut
Paris Intarakomalyasut
Paris Intarakomalyasut
Paris Intarakomalyasut
Paris Intarakomalyasut
Paris Intarakomalyasut